Lawn Bowls at the 1979 South Pacific Games was held from 28 August to 8 September 1979 in Suva, Fiji.

Men's results

Women's results

See also
 Lawn bowls at the Pacific Games

References

Lawn bowls at the Pacific Games